Olaf the Swede may refer to:
 Olof the Brash, Swedish chieftain who conquered Denmark in the late 9th century or early 10th century and founded the House of Olaf
 Olof Skötkonung, son of Eric the Victorious and Sigrid the Haughty